"Roger, Wilco" are procedure words for radio telephone meaning "understood, will comply".

Roger Wilco may also refer to:

 Roger Wilco (software), one of the first VOIP client programs designed primarily for use with online multiplayer video games
 Roger Wilco, a character from Space Quest
 "Roger Wilco", a song from Shawn Colvin's 2001 album Whole New You

See also
 Roger, masculine given name or surname
 Wilco (disambiguation)